The Springfield Armory Hellcat is a polymer frame striker-fired micro-compact semi-automatic pistol sold in the United States by Springfield Armory, Inc., and manufactured in Croatia by HS Produkt. Introduced in September 2019, it is chambered in 9×19mm Parabellum and intended for concealed carry, with 10-, 11-, 13-, and 15-Round magazines. The Hellcat was named 2020 Handgun of the Year by American Rifleman magazine.

Features
The Hellcat is a striker-fired handgun with a stainless steel slide. There is a blade safety on the trigger, and an optional low-profile external ambidextrous manual thumb safety. The 11-round flush-fit magazine holds one more round than the SIG Sauer P365. There is also an extended 13-round or 15-round magazine. The slide has cocking serrations fore and aft, the rear extending over the top of the gun to provide three points of positive grip for manipulating the slide. This gun also includes an accessory rail for mounting lights and lasers.

Versions
The OSP ("Optic Sight Pistol") version of the Hellcat has a removable plate on the slide, which allows a red dot sight to be installed.

Upon introduction, the Hellcat was only available in the color black. In June 2020, Springfield Armory introduced a version of the Hellcat in a flat dark earth (FDE) color.

References

External links
 
 Springfield Armory Hellcat from Hickok45 via YouTube
 Springfield Armory Releases Hellcat from triple7firearms.com

9mm Parabellum semi-automatic pistols
Springfield Armory Inc. firearms
Semi-automatic pistols of the United States
Weapons and ammunition introduced in 2019